Andamarca may refer to:
Andamarca (Oruro), a town and municipality in Bolivia
, capital of Carmen Salcedo District, Lucanas Province, Ayacucho Region, Peru
Andamarca District, Concepción Province, Junín Region, Peru